Wang Guifang (born 23 October 1962) is a Chinese speed skater. She competed in two events at the 1984 Winter Olympics.

References

External links
 

1962 births
Living people
Chinese female speed skaters
Olympic speed skaters of China
Speed skaters at the 1984 Winter Olympics
Place of birth missing (living people)